Kukoamines are chemicals that are present in some plants including Lycium chinense, potatoes, and tomatoes.  The most prevalent example is kukoamine A; others include kukoamine B, C, and D.

Chemically, kukoamines are catechols and also dihydrocaffeic acid derivatives of polyamines.

References 

Catechols